Purusia wappesi is a species of beetle in the family Cerambycidae. It was described by Martins and Galileo in 2004. It is known from Bolivia.

References

Hemilophini
Beetles described in 2004